An X-ray filter is a material placed in front of an X-ray source in order to reduce the intensity of particular wavelengths from its spectrum and selectively alter the distribution of X-ray wavelengths within a given beam.

When X-rays hit matter, part of the incoming beam is transmitted through the material and part of it is absorbed by the material. The amount absorbed is dependent on the material's mass absorption coefficient and tends to decrease for incident photons of greater energy. True absorption occurs when X-rays of sufficient energy cause electron energy level transitions in the atoms of the absorbing material. The energy from these X-rays are used to excite the atoms and do not continue past the material (thus being "filtered" out). Because of this, despite the general trend of decreased absorption at higher energy wavelengths, there are periodic spikes in the absorption characteristics of any given material corresponding to each of the atomic energy level transitions. These spikes are called absorption edges. The result is that every material preferentially filters out x-rays corresponding to and slightly above their electron energy levels, while generally allowing X-rays with energies slightly less than these levels to transmit through relatively unscathed.

Therefore, it is possible to selectively fine tune which wavelengths of x-rays are present in a beam by matching materials with particular absorption characteristics to different X-ray source spectra.

Applications

For example, a copper X-ray source may preferentially produce a beam of x-rays with wavelengths 154 and 139 picometres. Nickel has an absorption edge at 149 pm, between the two copper lines. Thus, using nickel as a filter for copper would result in the absorption of the slightly higher energy 139 pm x-rays, while letting the 154 pm rays through without a significant decrease in intensity. Thus, a copper X-ray source with a nickel filter can produce a nearly monochromatic X-ray beam with photons of mostly 154 pm.

For medical purposes, X-ray filters are used to selectively attenuate, or block out, low-energy rays during x-ray imaging (radiography). Low energy x-rays (less than 30 keV) contribute little to the resultant image as they are heavily absorbed by the patient's soft tissues (particularly the skin).  Additionally, this absorption adds to the risk of stochastic (e.g. cancer) or non stochastic radiation effects (e.g. tissue reactions) in the patient. Thus, it is favorable to remove these low energy X-rays from the incident light beam. X-ray filtration may be inherent due to the X-ray tube and housing material itself or added from additional sheets of filter material. The minimum filtration used is usually 2.5 mm aluminium (Al) equivalent, although there is an increasing trend to use greater filtration. Manufacturers of modern fluoroscopy equipment utilize a system of adding a variable thickness of copper (Cu) filtration according to patient thickness. This typically ranges from 0.1 to 0.9 mm Cu.

X-ray filters are also used for X-ray crystallography, in determinations of the interatomic spaces of crystalline solids. These lattice spacings can be determined using Bragg diffraction, but this technique requires scans to be done with approximately monochromatic X-ray beams. Thus, filter set ups like the copper nickel system described above are used to allow only a single X-ray wavelength to penetrate through to a target crystal, allowing the resulting scattering to determine the diffraction distance.

Various elemental effects

Suitable for X-ray crystallography:

 Zirconium - Absorbs Bremsstrahlung & K-Beta. 
 Iron - Absorbs the entire spectra.
 Molybdenum - Absorbs Bremsstrahlung - Leaving K-Beta & K-Alpha.
 Aluminium - 'Pinches' Bremsstrahlung* & Removes 3rd Generation peaks.
 Silver - Same as Aluminium, But to greater extent.
 Indium - Same as Iron, But to lesser extent.
 Copper - Same as Aluminium, Leaving only 1st Generation Peaks.

Suitable for Radiography:
 Molybdenum - Used in Mammography
 Rhodium - Used in Mammography with Rhodium anodes
 Aluminium - Used in general radiography x-ray tubes
 Copper - Used in general radiography - especially in paediatric applications.
 Silver - Used in Mammography with tungsten anode
 Tantalum - Used in fluoroscopy applications with tungsten anodes
 Niobium - Used in radiography and dental radiography with tungsten anodes
 Erbium - Used in radiography with tungsten anodes

Notes:
 - Bremsstrahlung pinching is due to the atomic mass. The denser the atom, the higher the X-Ray Absorption. Only the higher energy X-Rays pass through the filter, appearing as if the Bremsstrahlung continuum had been pinched.  
 - In this case, Mo appears to leave K-Alpha and K-Beta alone while absorbing the Bremsstrahlung. This is due to Mo absorbing all of the spectra's energy, but in doing so produces the same characteristic peaks as generated by the target.

Further reading 
 B.D. Cullity & S.R. Stock, Elements of X-Ray Diffraction, 3rd Ed., Prentice-Hall Inc., 2001, p 167-171, .
 CFL imaging diagnostic

See also

 X-ray crystallography
 X-rays
 Bragg diffraction

Filter